Linda C. Gugin is  a Professor Emeritus of Political Science at Indiana University Southeast, active member of the Indiana Historical Society, and author and coauthor of many books related to legal history.  She is a principal biographer of Sherman Minton.

Books

References

Living people
People from Dearborn County, Indiana
Writers from Indiana
Indiana Historical Society
Year of birth missing (living people)